Joseph Edgar Foreman (born July 28, 1974), better known by his stage name Afroman, is an American rapper, singer, songwriter, comedian and musician. He is best known for his songs "Because I Got High", released in 2000, and "Crazy Rap", which was released in 2001 and both were featured on his album The Good Times. Afroman was nominated for a Grammy award in 2002.

Early life
Born in Los Angeles, Afroman initially grew up in South-Central Los Angeles. He later lived in Palmdale in the High Desert of Southern California, and then Hattiesburg, Mississippi.

Career
Afroman's musical career began in the eighth grade, when he began recording homemade songs and selling them to his classmates. "The first tape I made was about my eighth-grade teacher", he once recalled. "She got me kicked out of school for sagging my pants, which was a big deal back then. So I wrote this song about her and it sold about 400 copies: it was selling to teachers, students, just about everybody. And I realized that, even though I wasn't at school, my song was at school, so in a way I was still there. All these people would come by my house just to give me comments about how cool they thought the song was." Foreman also performed in his church at a young age, playing both the drums and guitar.

In 1998, Afroman released his first album, My Fro-losophy, and later relocated to Hattiesburg, Mississippi, where he met drummer Jody Stallone, keyboardist/bassist Darrell Havard and producer Tim Ramenofsky (a.k.a. Headfridge).

Ramenofsky produced and released Afroman's album Because I Got High in 2000 on T-Bones Records; it was distributed primarily through concerts and the file-sharing service Napster before its title track was played on The Howard Stern Show. Afroman was inspired to write the song's lyrical content by his unwillingness to clean his room, and he ran with the idea of everyday tasks being derailed by drug use. In late 2001, the song became a hit and was featured in the films Jay and Silent Bob Strike Back, The Perfect Score, and Disturbia later in the 2000s. "Because I Got High" was nominated for the Grammy Award for Best Rap Solo Performance in 2002.

After the single's success, Afroman joined the lineup of Cypress Hill's fall festival "Smoke Out" with the Deftones, Method Man, and others. After this, Universal Records signed Afroman to a six-album deal, and Universal released The Good Times in 2001. The Good Times was a compilation of Afroman's first two albums and some new tracks.

Afroman started releasing his music independently and mostly through the Internet in 2004, and that year, he recorded Jobe Bells, which satirized traditional Christmas songs.

Afroman was part of the 2010 Gathering of the Juggalos lineup.

In October 2014, Afroman released a remix of his hit song "Because I Got High" in order to highlight the usefulness of cannabis as part of the effort to legalize its sale across the United States.

Personal life

Religion
In 2003, Afroman declared himself a Christian.

Assault case
On February 17, 2015, Afroman was midway through his performance at a live music venue in Biloxi, Mississippi, when a woman walked on stage. She approached Foreman from behind, drink in hand, while dancing. When she touched Foreman he spun around and punched her off the stage. He was subsequently escorted offstage by security and was arrested and taken into custody, and charged with assault. He was released on bond shortly thereafter.

There were reportedly 12 to 15 security guards on duty to manage a crowd in excess of 500 people. When interviewed, Foreman's representative claimed that the act was an involuntary reflex caused by the woman invading his space. He also stated that he mistook the woman for another audience member who had been consistently heckling him. He publicly apologized and sought assistance with anger management.

Raid on Ohio home
On August 23, 2022, TMZ reported that Afroman had taken to social media and posted images and videos of his home in Adams County, Ohio being raided by the sheriff's department. He reportedly asked for attorney Ben Crump. Local news media reached out to law enforcement who declined to give any information about the warrant and search. He also posted about a previous burglary on his home where he was threatened with arrest by the sheriff's department if he kept checking about the progress of the case and was told they didn't have time. He recorded a song criticizing the raid, titled "Will You Help Me Repair My Door", and released a music video of the song, composed entirely of security camera recordings of the raid, to his YouTube account on December 29, 2022.

Presidential candidacy 
On December 20, 2022, Afroman announced his candidacy in the 2024 presidential election. His campaign manager, Jason Savage, announced his candidacy on his behalf, citing inflation, the housing market, corruption, and legalizing marijuana as key issues of his campaign.

Discography 

My Fro-losophy (1998)
Because I Got High (2000)
Sell Your Dope (2000)
The Good Times (2001)
Afroholic... The Even Better Times (2004)
Jobe Bells (2004)
4R0:20 (2004)
The Hungry Hustlerz: Starvation Is Motivation (2004)
Drunk 'n' High (2006)
A Colt 45 Christmas (2006)
Waiting to Inhale (2008)
Frobama: Head of State (2009)
Marijuana Music (2013)
The Frorider (2014)
Happy to Be Alive (2016)
Cold Fro-T-5 and Two Frigg Fraggs (2017)
Save a Cadillac, Ride a Homeboy (2020)
Lemon Pound Cake (2022)
Famous Player (2023)

References

External links 

 
 
 Afroman at Discogs

1974 births
Living people
African-American Christians
American hip hop singers
Musicians from Hattiesburg, Mississippi
Rappers from Mississippi
Rappers from Los Angeles
Underground rappers
California Democrats
Cannabis music
Mississippi Democrats
West Coast hip hop musicians
American male drummers
American male bass guitarists
20th-century American singers
21st-century American singers
20th-century American drummers
21st-century American drummers
Guitarists from Los Angeles
Guitarists from Mississippi
20th-century American rappers
21st-century American rappers
African-American male rappers
21st-century American bass guitarists
20th-century American bass guitarists
20th-century American male singers
21st-century American male singers
African-American guitarists
20th-century African-American male singers
21st-century African-American musicians
Candidates in the 2024 United States presidential election